Kirensk Airport  is an airport in Irkutsk Oblast, Russia located 3 km west of Kirensk. It handles small transport aircraft.  This airfield was part of the Yakutsk-Kirensk-Krasnoyarsk leg of the World War II Lend-Lease program Alaska-Siberian (ALSIB) air route.
Angara Airlines serves scheduled flight to Irkutsk six times a week.

Airlines and destinations

References

Airports built in the Soviet Union
Airports in Irkutsk Oblast